Anapa Airport , also known as Vityazevo Airport is an international airport located near Vityazevo village  in Anapa, Russia. It serves the resort town of Anapa, as well as Novorossiysk and Temryuk with a total population of over 400,000 people.

The airport is a part of Basel Aero, airport managing holding that also runs Sochi International Airport, Krasnodar and Gelendzhik airports.
  
Passenger traffic of the Anapa airport in 2013 was 739,637 people.  The airport is among the top 30 of Russia's busiest airports.

Construction of a new terminal began in March 2016, and was completed in July 2017, when the new terminal building became operational.

History

In 1934, scheduled passenger flights from Krasnodar to Anapa were launched.

In 1960, Anapa airport started accommodating An-2, Morava aircraft. Flights were performed to Krasnodar, Novorossiysk, Gelendzhik. The airport had less than 10 staff with only one radio station that served as radio technical flight support.

In 1965, Anapa airport's building was constructed (now it hosts a first-aid station). An aerodrome started accommodating An-24 aircraft. The airport has expanded its destination map and launched flight service to Moscow, Kerch, Donetsk, Kharkiv, Sukhumi. Due to the increased passenger traffic and aircraft landings, the airport was relocated to Anapa's suburb, near Vityazevo village where it still operates. A new location allowed to accommodate larger aircraft such as An-10.

In 1969, construction of a new military airfield with a 2,500-m runway was launched near Vityazevo. It was kept secret due to military purposes of the facility.

In 1970, Vityazevo airport honors the 100,000th passenger.

In April 1974, An-24 performed the first regular passenger flight to Vityazevo.

In May 1974, a group of NATO military attachés went to Anapa on board the first flight Moscow – Anapa – Moscow. They oversaw the construction of the military runway that was one of the longest at that time in Soviet Union. There were about 12 aerodromes in total featuring the similar runways in the country.

In 1976, Vityazevo airport was officially opened. The new terminal could handle up to 70 daily flights originating from around 50 domestic airports.

In September 1976, a twin plane crash happened above Anapa when An-24 and Yak-40 crashed because of the aircraft dispatcher's fatal error. The tragedy claimed 70 lives.

In 1977, Тu-154s commenced flights to Vityazevo airport becoming the principal aircraft type in the fleet of Russian air carriers. A Тu-154 (USSR-85171) snapshot captured against the Anapa airport passenger terminal was reproduced on a Soviet postcard.

In 1982, An-26 owned by the Black Sea Fleet Naval Air Force crashed near Anapa killing nine.

In 1988, Anapa airport was separated from the 1st Krasnodar United Air Group and becomes an independent entity: a separate class-III airport under the North Caucasian Civil Aviation Authority. Upon installation of the SP-80M landing system, the aerodrome acquired an ICAO category I certificate.

In 1991, the airport performed 6,828 takeoffs and landings serving 439,600 passengers. During summer season the airport handled up to 52 flights operating at a full capacity.

Post-Soviet history
In 1993, Vityazevo airport acquired the status of an international airport. Austrian Airlines became the first international airline to open a branch office in Anapa.

In 2001, Siberia (S7 Airlines) launched operations at Vityazevo International Airport.

In 2005, SABRE, SITA, and Kupol passenger handling systems that enable passenger check-in to any destination in the world and e-tickets usage, were put into operation. In 2005, OJSC Anapa Airport won the "Russian National Olympus" award for outstanding contribution to the historical development of Russia in the "Outstanding small and medium businesses" category.

In 2006, the first scheduled flight of a Boeing (VP-BTD) of the S7 air carrier was performed.

In 2008, the first scheduled flight of an Airbus (VP-BHI) of the S7 air carrier was carried out.  Later that year, the airport won the "Kuban Economic Leader 2007 – Territorial Contest Winner" award presented by the Krasnodar Territory Governor, A.N. Tkachev, in the "Aviation Transport" industry category. And in the same year, the airport won the "Kuban Transport Olympus" award bestowed on Kuban Transport Complex businesses "For rapid development momentum and flight safety".

In 2010, in accordance with the Federal Targeted Programs "Development of the Transportation System of Russia (2010-2015)" and "Modernization of the Transportation System of Russia (2002-2010)", the "Reconstruction of Anapa (Vityazevo) airport aerodrome" program was approved. The reconstruction was carried out in five stages during 2010-2012

In 2011, S7 Boeing 737-400 (VP-BAN) flying from Domodedovo became the first scheduled flight after runway reconstruction. It carried 125 passengers.

In December 2011, Anapa International Airport first accommodated Sukhoi Superjet 100 operated by Aeroflot.

In 2012, a new ramp in the airport was put into operation.

In January 2014, Anapa International Airport was fully privatized after Russian Auction House had sold out 25.5% of government's stake to Sistema LLC for 153.6 million rubles ($4.4 million).

In April 2014, specialty emergency services facility was opened in the airport.

In June 2014, Anapa airport launched direct air service with Simferopol, the administrative center of the disputed Crimean peninsula Annexation of Crimea by the Russian Federation .

In June 2017, at Anapa Airport, the new terminal began its work. The new terminal was built so that in case of the weather, construction or other reasons, Anapa will officially serve Sochi International Airport during FIFA-2018.

Airlines and destinations

Statistics

See also
 
List of the busiest airports in Russia 
List of the busiest airports in Europe
List of the busiest airports in the former USSR

References

External links

NOAA/NWS current weather observations
ASN Accident history for URKA

Airports in Krasnodar Krai
Basel Aero